The Mystery of the Yellow Room is a 2003 French comedy film based on the 1907 novel of the same name by Gaston Leroux.

It was followed by a sequel The Perfume of the Lady in Black in 2005.

Cast 
 Denis Podalydès - Joseph Rouletabille, crime reporter
 Jean-Noël Brouté - Sainclair, his photographer
 Claude Rich - de Marquet, the judge
 Scali Delpeyrat - Mallet, his clerk
 Sabine Azéma - Mathilde Stangerson
 Michael Lonsdale - Professor Stangerson
 Julos Beaucarne - Old Jacques
 Olivier Gourmet - Robert Darzac
 Pierre Arditi - Inspector Larsan
 Isabelle Candelier - Madame Bernier
 Dominique Parent - Monsieur Bernier
 George Aguilar - Little Foot, the gamekeeper
 Bruno Podalydès - the doctor

References

External links 

2003 comedy films
2003 films
Films based on works by Gaston Leroux
Films based on French novels
Remakes of French films
French comedy films
2000s French films
2000s French-language films